Finding Iris Chang: Friendship, Ambition, and the Loss of an Extraordinary Mind is a biography of Iris Chang, author of the best-selling history book, The Rape of Nanking.  Written by Chang's friend, journalist Paula Kamen, and published in November 2007, the book's writing and research were motivated by Chang's suicide in 2004.  Kamen authored a Salon.com eulogy for Chang that received an "overwhelming" response, and this prompted her to expand upon the subject of Chang's life and death with a full-length biography.

References

External links 
 Finding Iris Chang at Google Books

2007 non-fiction books
American biographies
Biographies about writers
Chinese-American literature